Beyesh is a Bashkir folk song. The song describes the batyr (a Bashki folk hero) Beyesh, who fought for the people's rights and hid from the authorities.

Legend 
According to legend, in the mid-19th century, when the Bashkirs were transferred from a civilian to a military caste, they took part in the wars and campaigns in Russia, engaged in the construction of fortifications and urban amenities, and assumed provincial Zemstvo duties. Not wanting to bear the weight of military service, Bashkirs deserted. Beiesh and his companions were the runaway soldiers.

To capture them, detachments were formed, but Beieish and mates Abubakir Abdakov, Kunakbay Abdrahimov, Rahmatullah Barracks, Kurman Ilbakov, Kutlusha Murzagulov eluded capture for 10 years, from 1838 to 1848. Biish stayed in Burzyan, Tamyanskoy parishes in the area and Kaginskogo Avzyan-Petrovsky works inVerhneuralskiy County. In 1848, a detachment Skoryatinova on the trail of Biisha after clashes with Biish and his supporters captured them. In honor of this capture, the Biisha Skoryatinov police captain was awarded the Order of St. Vladimir IV degree.

The song resembled those of Salavat Yulaev.

References

Bashkir folk songs
Year of song unknown
19th-century songs
Songwriter unknown